Abim is a town in the Northern Region of Uganda. It is the chief municipal, administrative, and commercial center of Abim District. The district is named after the town.

Location
Abim is located in Abim District, Karamoja sub-region, Northern Region, Uganda. The geographical coordinates of the town are:2°42'07.2"N 33°39'36.0"E (Latitude:2.7020; Longitude:33.6600).

Population
In 2002, the national population census enumerated the population  of the town at 7,645. In 2014, the national population census and household survey enumerated 17,168 people. In 2015, the Uganda Bureau of Statistics (UBOS) estimated the town's mid-year population at about 18,100. In 2020, UBOS estimated the population of Abim Town Council at 24,400. UBOS calculated that the population of Abim, Uganda increased at an average annual rate of 6.2 percent, between 2015 and 2020.

Points of interest
The following points of interest lie within the town limits or close to the edges of town: (a) the offices of Abim Town Council (b) the headquarters of Abim District Administration (c) Abim Central Market, the source of daily fresh produce (d) Abim General Hospital, a 100-bed public hospital administered by the Uganda Ministry of Health (e) a branch of DFCU Bank (f) a branch of Stanbic Bank Uganda and (g) Soroti–Amuria–Abim–Kotido Road, which passes through town in a general south to north direction.

See also

References

External links
 Abim's Rocky Walk In Quest of A Clean Town

Abim District
Karamoja
Northern Region, Uganda
Populated places in Uganda